The GE Dash 8-32BWH, also known as the P32-8BWH, B32-8WH, or P32-8, is a passenger train locomotive used by Amtrak, based on GE's Dash 8 series of freight train locomotives. Built in 1991, they were the first locomotives purchased to replace the EMD F40PH.

Design 
The Dash 8-32BWH operates in a diesel-electric configuration that uses DC to power the traction motors, producing  at 1047 rpm. When providing head end power to the train, the engine is speed locked to 900 rpm. Power output to the traction motors is  when running in HEP mode with a 0 kW HEP load. Traction horsepower decreases to a bare minimum of  when providing the maximum  HEP load to the train.

History

Twenty of these locomotives were delivered to Amtrak in 1991, numbered 500 through 519. They were nicknamed "Pepsi Cans" by many railfans, due to being delivered in a wide-striped red, white, and blue livery. Since the most recent overhaul, however, the locomotives now wear the Phase V livery.

The Dash 8-32BWH has since been relegated to yard switching (mainly in Los Angeles, Oakland, Chicago, Miami, and the Auto Train terminals), maintenance of way service, and transfer service, displaced by the newer and more powerful GE Genesis and Siemens Charger. However, the Dash–8s occasionally substitute for the Genesis and Charger units if necessary. The Los Angeles-based units see frequent use on the Coast Starlight and Pacific Surfliner, and many are also frequently used on Amtrak's Cascades service. The East Coast-based units back up the routes in and out of Washington DC, sometimes running on the Cardinal, Crescent, Silver Service, or the Virginia Northeast Regional train.

Two of the locomotives, 501 and 502, were sold to the California Department of Transportation. The locomotives were renumbered 2051 and 2052, and received the Amtrak California paint scheme. They are used on the San Joaquin and Capitol Corridor'' trains.

References

External links 
 
 General Electric Four-Axle Dash-8s

B-B locomotives
8-32BWH
Passenger locomotives
Amtrak locomotives
Diesel-electric locomotives of the United States
Railway locomotives introduced in 1991
Standard gauge locomotives of the United States